Global feminism is a feminist theory closely aligned with post-colonial theory and postcolonial feminism. It concerns itself primarily with the forward movement of women's rights on a global scale.  Using different historical lenses from the legacy of colonialism, global feminists adopt global causes and start movements which seek to dismantle what they argue are the currently predominant structures of global patriarchy. Global feminism is also known as world feminism and international feminism.

Two historical examples Global Feminists might use to expose patriarchal structures at work in colonized groups or societies are medieval Spain (late eleventh to thirteenth centuries) and nineteenth-century Cuba. The former example concerns women of the Mudejar communities of Islamic Spain and the strict sexual codes through which their social activity was regulated. Mudejar women could be sold into slavery as a result of sexual activity with a Christian man; this was to escape the deemed punishment. Because of their simultaneous roles as upholding one's family honor and one of "conquered status and gender", "Mudejar women suffered double jeopardy in their sexual contact with Christians [in Spain]".

Nineteenth-century Cuba can be looked at as an example of colonialism and neocolonialism working together in a slave-based society to affect women's lives under patriarchy, where Cuba "remained a Spanish colony while enduring a neocolonial relationship with the United States". Havana, a city noted for its "absence of the female form", had, "of all the major cities in the West...the most strict social restrictions on the female portion of its population". Upper-class Cuban women were "a constant visual reminder of the separation between elite white society and the people of color they ruled".

Transnational mothering
Forced commitment to double shifts, struggle for individual autonomy, and blurring the private and public sphere of labor are all additional concerns to the primary issue for migrant women, which is the right to motherhood. The phenomena of motherhood in a transnational and contemporary time creates structural constraints for migrant women. Abusive employers and intimate violence is not the only problem these women have to face, but there are structural issues regarding the right to motherhood in this transnational era. Women immigrants leave their chance overseas at an idealized motherhood of watching their children grow up while performing their gender role, and deport to be the breadwinner. The restructuring of care from the effects of globalization and neoliberalism institutionalizes these women.

Globalization is constantly changing and as a result it is supporting the phenomena of women in the global south migrating to developed countries to serve domestic labors. The role of transnational mothering within a neoliberal spectrum affects the exploitation of women through the deprivation of their citizen rights, by extracting the benefits of immigrant's labor while minimizing or eliminating any obligations, whether social or fiscal to the society or state. Migrant women of Third World countries are not drawn from their countries to the advancing economy of the First World, rather drawn from their economies that have been disrupted and distorted by Western colonial incursions, leaving many to be torn free of their roots and recruited to countries to fill its non permanent labor needs, preventing competition with native workers; fulfilling the complementary void. Transnational mothering is viewed as an accommodation for both classes.

Motherhood, along with reproductive freedom and marriage, is the fundamental right of women but is prohibited by nations that justify foreign domestic services, as much as view immigrant women as a threat to its nationalism. Nations create a process of racial formation through which women of different national and racial identities experience discrepant integration within a society, ultimately contributing to hierarchies of citizenship. In relation to social Darwinism, natives believe that Third World migrants "just can't make it", and fear degeneration, thus nations try to weed out those who do not fit the upper or middle class society in ways such as sterilization; e.g.; black women are identified as devious, immoral, domineering, sexually promiscuous, and bad mothers, resulting in their reproductive rights being threatened by regulation.

See also 
Feminism
RAWA
Transnational feminism

References

Further reading 
Feldman, Shelley. "Exploring Theories of Patriarchy: A Perspective from Contemporary Bangladesh," Signs: Journal of Women in Culture and Society. 25.4 (Summer 2001), p. 1108.
Fonow, Mary Margret. "Human Rights, Feminism, and Transnational Labor Solidarity." Just Advocacy? Women's Human Rights,Transnational Feminisms, and the Politics of Representation. Ed. Wendy S. Hasford and Wendy Kozol. New Brunswick: Rutgers UP, 2005. 221–43.
Mendez, Jennifer Bickham. "Creating Alternatives from a Gender Perspective: Transnational Organizing for Maquila Workers' Rights in Central America". Women's Activism and Globalization: Linking Local Struggles and Transnational Politics. Ed. Nancy A. Naples and Manisha Desai. New York: Routledge Press, 2002. 121–41.

External links
Amnesty International

Co-Op America
feminist.com
The Feminist Majority Foundation
Global Exchange
SweatFreeWorld
UNITE HERE

 World
Feminist theory
Political philosophy
Sociological theories
Multicultural feminism
Globalism